Lynn or Lynne Latham may refer to:

 Lynn Marie Latham, television producer
 Lynne Latham, also credited as Lynn Latham, dancer and fashion designer